Kevin Guthrie (born 21 March 1988) is a Scottish actor. His best known roles are Ally in Sunshine on Leith (2013), Ewan Tavendale in Terence Davies's Sunset Song (2015), and Abernathy in the first 2 Fantastic Beast films - Fantastic Beast and where to find them (2016), and Fantastic Beast: The Crimes of Grindelwald (2018). He also performed the lead role in Peter Pan at the King's Theatre, Glasgow, in 2011.  

On 16 April 2021, Guthrie was convicted of a sexual assault that occurred in 2017 for which he was sentenced to three years in prison and placed on the Sexual Offenders Register indefinitely. He was freed in May 2022 after his sentence was reduced to two years on appeal.

Career
Guthrie attended the PACE Youth Theatre in Paisley and appeared in small roles in television and film. He studied at the Royal Conservatoire of Scotland (then the Royal Scottish Academy of Music and Drama). He left after receiving the title role in the National Theatre of Scotland's production of Peter Pan in 2010, graduating later in 2011 with a BA in Acting.

Alongside theatre work, including a role in 2013's Macbeth starring James McAvoy at Trafalgar Studios, Guthrie had a starring role in 2013's musical drama Sunshine on Leith. He appeared in the pilots of the British sitcoms Two Doors Down (2013) and Miller's Mountain (2014), but both roles were recast when these series were commissioned for a full series. In 2015 he acted in Robert Carlyle's directorial debut The Legend of Barney Thomson and in the role of Ewan Tavendale in Terence Davies's adaptation of the novel Sunset Song, opposite Agyness Deyn.

In 2016 Guthrie appeared in Gillies MacKinnon's remake of the 1949 Ealing Studios classic Whisky Galore!. The film was widely released in the UK in May 2017. Later in the year, he appeared in Christopher Nolan's war epic Dunkirk. In 2020 he portrayed Fergus Suter in the Netflix historical sports drama TV miniseries The English Game.

Following his conviction for sexual assault in April 2021, Guthrie was dropped by BBC Scotland from his role on Inside Central Station, of which he narrated the first two seasons. Shows featuring Guthrie were also removed from the BBC iPlayer.

Sexual assault conviction
In September 2020, Guthrie was charged with sexual assault. A trial before jury was set for January 2021 but was administratively adjourned due to the COVID-19 pandemic, and Guthrie remained on bail in the interim. On 16 April 2021, he was convicted following a four-day trial at Glasgow Sheriff Court of carrying out a sexual assault on a woman that took place at the residence of fellow actor Scott Reid in Kelvindale, Glasgow between 30 September and 1 October 2017. On 14 May 2021, he was sentenced to three years in prison and was placed on the sex offenders' register indefinitely. An attempted appeal of his conviction was rejected in November 2021.

Guthrie was released from HM Prison Dumfries in May 2022, having had term reduced to two years following a successful appeal to cut his prison time. He failed, however, in attempting to have his conviction quashed.

Personal life
The son of a nurse and an electrician, Guthrie grew up in Neilston and has two older sisters. He attended St Luke's High School in Barrhead, and later Langside College in Glasgow. He has lived in North London and in Yorkhill, Glasgow.

Select filmography

Film

Television

† These roles were later played by Jamie Quinn and Kevin Mains respectively, when the shows were picked up for full series.

Discography

Soundtrack appearances

References

External links

Living people
1988 births
Scottish male film actors
Scottish male television actors
Scottish male stage actors
Male actors from Glasgow
People from Neilston
Scottish male child actors
British people convicted of sexual assault
Prisoners and detainees of Scotland